Celta is Galician, Portuguese and Spanish for the Celts. It may also refer to:

 Certificate in English Language Teaching to Adults (CELTA), an English teaching certificate
 Celta (train), an international train service connecting Vigo and Porto
 Chevrolet Celta, a low cost supermini car produced by General Motors do Brasil
 Celta de Vigo, a Spanish football club
 Celta de Vigo B, the reserve team of Celta de Vigo
 CD Vigo FS, a former futsal club based in Vigo, Spain
 Celta de Vigo Baloncesto, a Spanish women's basketball from Vigo